Osah Bernardinho Tetteh (born 2 July 1996), commonly known as Bernardinho, is a Ghanaian professional footballer who plays as a forward for Canadian club Atlético Ottawa.

Club career

Early career
Bernardinho began his youth career with Ghanaian side Afienya City, before being scouted by Godwin Attram, who recruited him to Attram De Visser Soccer Academy at age sixteen. In 2017, he played for Ghana Premier League club Accra Great Olympics.

In May 2017, he impressed on trial with Dutch Eredivisie side Willem II, but wasn't offered a contract due to regulations on non-EU players.

Westerlo
In July 2017, Bernardinho signed a three-year contract with Belgian First Division B side Westerlo. He made his professional debut on 12 August 2017 in a league match against Tubize. On 27 August, he scored his first goal for Westerlo in a Belgian Cup match against Toekomst Menen. Bernardinho made a total of fourteen league appearances that season and two in the Belgian Cup.

Loan to ASV Geel
On 14 August 2018, Bernardinho was sent on a season-long loan to Belgian First Amateur Division side ASV Geel. He made 29 league appearances that year, scoring six goals, and made one appearance in the Belgian Cup.

Loan to Heist
On 2 July 2019, Bernardinho was sent on another season-long loan to the Belgian third tier, this time with Heist.

Atlético Ottawa
On 1 April 2020, Bernardinho signed with Canadian Premier League side Atlético Ottawa.

Career statistics

References

External links
 
 

1996 births
Living people
Association football forwards
Ghanaian footballers
Footballers from Accra
Ghanaian expatriate footballers
Expatriate footballers in Belgium
Ghanaian expatriate sportspeople in Belgium
Expatriate soccer players in Canada
Ghanaian expatriate sportspeople in Canada
Accra Great Olympics F.C. players
K.V.C. Westerlo players
AS Verbroedering Geel players
K.S.K. Heist players
Atlético Ottawa players
Ghana Premier League players
Challenger Pro League players
Belgian Third Division players
Canadian Premier League players
Attram De Visser Soccer Academy players